The Black Pin is a 2016 Montenegrin drama film directed by Ivan Marinović. It was selected as the Montenegrin entry for the Best Foreign Language Film at the 89th Academy Awards but it was not nominated.

Cast
 Nikola Ristanovski as Petar
 Bogdan Diklić as Dondo
 Jelisaveta Sablić as Baba
 Filip Klicov as Đorđe
 Leon Lucev as Savo

See also
 List of submissions to the 89th Academy Awards for Best Foreign Language Film
 List of Montenegrin submissions for the Academy Award for Best Foreign Language Film

References

External links
 

2016 films
2016 drama films
Montenegrin drama films
Films set in Montenegro
2010s Serbian-language films